St. Petersburg, Florida, held an election for mayor on August 24, 2021. Incumbent Democratic mayor Rick Kriseman is term-limited and cannot seek re-election to a third term in office. Municipal elections in St. Petersburg are officially nonpartisan. All candidates appeared on the same primary ballot, and because no candidate garnered at least 50% of the vote, the top two vote-getters advanced to a runoff election on November 2, 2021. Former Pinellas County commissioner Ken Welch easily defeated city councillor Robert Blackmon in the runoff and became the first black mayor of St. Petersburg.

Candidates

Declared

Democratic Party
Michael Ingram, political science major at the University of South Florida
Wengay Newton, former state representative, former city councillor, and candidate for the Pinellas County commission in 2020
Marcile Powers, small business owner
Darden Rice, city councillor
Ken Welch, former Pinellas County commissioner

Republican Party
Robert G. Blackmon, city councillor
Pete Boland, restaurateur

Independents
Torry Nelson, teacher

Did not file
Paul Congemi, singer-songwriter and perennial candidate (Party affiliation: Republican)
Michael Levinson, poet and perennial candidate (Party affiliation: Independent) (ran a write-in campaign)
Vincent Nowicki, realtor (Party affiliation: Independent)

Declined
Rick Baker, former mayor (Party affiliation: Republican) (endorsed Newton, then Blackmon)
Jeff Brandes, state senator (Party affiliation: Republican) (endorsed Blackmon)
Ed Montanari, chair of the St. Petersburg City Council (Party affiliation: Republican)

General election

Endorsements

Fundraising

Polling

Debates

Results

Runoff

Candidates
Robert Blackmon (R), city councillor
Ken Welch (D), former Pinellas County commissioner

Polling

with Robert Blackmon and Darden Rice

with Darden Rice and Ken Welch

Endorsements
Endorsements in bold were made after the general election.

Results

Notes

References

External links 
Official campaign websites
 Robert Blackmon (R) for Mayor 
 Pete Boland (R) for Mayor
 Michael Ingram (D) for Mayor
 Michael Levinson (I, write-in) for Mayor
 Torry Nelson (I) for Mayor 
 Wengay Newton (D) for Mayor 
 Marcile Powers (D) for Mayor
 Darden Rice (D) for Mayor 
 Ken Welch (D) for Mayor

21st century in St. Petersburg, Florida
Mayoral elections in St. Petersburg, Florida
St. Petersburg, Florida
St. Petersburg